Squadrons of the United States Air Force Security Forces, with locations:

See also
 List of United States Air Force squadrons

References

Security forces